The 2014 mid-year rugby union internationals (also known as the summer internationals in the Northern Hemisphere) were international rugby union matches mostly played in the Southern Hemisphere during the June international window.

These matches were part of the International Rugby Board (IRB) global rugby calendar (2012–19) that includes test matches between touring Northern Hemisphere nations and home Southern Hemisphere nations, whilst some of the touring teams played mid-week matches against provincial or regional sides. In addition to this, the calendar gave Tier 2 nations the opportunity to host Tier 1 nations outside the November international window leading up to the 2015 Rugby World Cup.

All Six Nations teams were in action, with England playing a three-test series against New Zealand, whilst playing a mid-week match against the Crusaders. France played Australia in a three-test series, whilst Italy played Fiji, Samoa and Japan. Scotland, the only nation that played four tests, visited the Americas, playing the United States, Canada and Argentina, before playing South Africa outside the IRB international window. Unlike previous June windows, 2014 saw Tier 3 fixtures with Uruguay hosting Canadian side BC Bears, to celebrate the 125th Anniversary of the British Columbia Rugby Union. It also acted as a preparation match for Uruguay, ahead of their 2015 Rugby World Cup repechage play-offs in August against Hong Kong.

Tonga played a test match against a Pacific Barbarians side in Auckland to fill a shortfall in their international calendar leading into the World Cup.

Overview

Series

Other tours

Fixtures

30 May–1 June

Notes:
 Twelve players made their international debuts for Samoa, eight in the starting XV; Vavao Afemai, Oneone Fa'afou, Patrick Fa'apale, Jake Grey, Reupena Levasa, Faalemiga Selesele, Aniseko Sio and Tulolo Tulolo, and four off the bench; Sam Aiono, Lio Lolo, Vaiofoga Simanu and Kaino Thomsen.
 Japan's Hitoshi Ono surpassed Hirotoki Onozawa's 81 caps to become Japan's most capped player with 82 caps.
 This was Japan's seventh consecutive win, the longest winning streak they have ever had.

Notes:
 Jon Callard coached England, with Lancaster in New Zealand with the touring 30-man squad.
 This was the Barbarians' first back-to-back win since beating England and Wales in 2011, which was also the last time the Barbarians beat England.

7 June

Notes:
 Isei Colati made his international debut for Fiji.
 Andrea de Marchi and Guglielmo Palazzani made their international debuts for Italy.

Notes:
 Malakai Fekitoa and TJ Perenara made their international debuts for New Zealand.
 Chris Pennell and Joe Gray made their international debuts for England.
 With this win, New Zealand win 31 consecutive home matches, a world record by a test team.

Notes:
 James Slipper and Wycliff Palu earned their 50th test cap for Australia.
 Sam Carter made his international debut for Australia.
 Felix Le Bourhis and Rémi Lamerat made their international debuts for France.

Notes:
 Ramiro Herrera made his international debut for Argentina.
 Rodney Ah You, Robbie Diack and Kieran Marmion made their international debuts for Ireland.
 Paul O'Connell played his 100th test match; 93 for Ireland and 7 for the British and Irish Lions.
 This was Ireland's first victory over Argentina, when playing on Argentine soil, in a fully test capped match.

Notes:
 Danny Barrett made his international debut for the United States.
 Alex Allan, Blair Cowan, Gordon Reid and Finn Russell made their international debuts for Scotland.

14 June

Notes:
 Dario Chistolini made his international debut for Italy.
 Marco Bortolami surpassed Martin Castrogiovanni and Sergio Parisse, to become Italy's most capped player with 106 caps.

Notes:
 Jerome Kaino earned his 50th test cap for New Zealand.
 Patrick Tuipulotu made his international debut for New Zealand.
 Kieran Brookes made his international debut for England.
 New Zealand retain the Hillary Shield, the fifth time they have held the trophy.

Notes:
 James Horwill earned his 50th test cap for Australia.
 Nathan Charles, Luke Jones and Laurie Weeks made their international debuts for Australia.
 Alexandre Menini made his international debut for France.
 Australia reclaim the Trophée des Bicentenaires for the first time since 2010, after losing it in 2012.
 This was the first time France has failed to score any points against Australia, in the 44 meetings between the two teams.
 Fewest points in an Australian win since their 6–3 win over New Zealand in 1958, and first Australian win without a try since their 21–13 win over Wales in 2001.

Notes:
 Cornal Hendricks and Lood de Jager made their international debuts for South Africa.
 Victor Matfield joined John Smit as the most capped South African player with 111 caps.
 Gareth Davies and Matthew Morgan made their international debuts for Wales.
 Adam Jones played his 100th test match; 95 for Wales and 5 for the British and Irish Lions.

Notes:
 Kevin Bryce and Grayson Hart made their international debuts for Scotland.

Notes:
 James Cronin, Rob Herring and Noel Reid made their international debuts for Ireland.
 This was Ireland's first test series victory over Argentina, and with it, they retain the Admiral Brown Cup.

17–22 June

Notes:
 Matías Moroni made his international debut for Argentina.

Notes:
 Mauro Bergamasco becomes the sixth Italian player to earn 100 test caps.
 This win was Japan's tenth consecutive win, a record for a Tier 2 nation. 

Notes:
 Will Skelton made his international debut for Australia.
 The 43,188-person crowd was a record crowd for an Australian test at Allianz Stadium.

Notes:
 Victor Matfield surpassed John Smit, to become South Africa's most capped player with 112 caps.
 South Africa retain the Prince William Cup for the seventh time.

28 June

Notes:
 Marnitz Boshoff, Stephan Lewies, Marcel van der Merwe, Oupa Mohojé and Handré Pollard made their international debuts for South Africa.
 Adam Ashe and Tyrone Holmes made their international debuts for Scotland.

See also
 Mid-year rugby union tests
 End-of-year rugby union tests
 2014 Africa Cup
 2014 Asian Five Nations
 2014 IRB Nations Cup
 2014 IRB Tbilisi Cup
 2014 end-of-year rugby union tests

References

2014
2014–15 in European rugby union
2014–15 in Japanese rugby union
2014 in Oceanian rugby union
2014 in North American rugby union
2014 in South American rugby union
2014 in African rugby union